People's Square is a large interchange station of the Shanghai Metro, located below People's Square, also next to People's Park and Nanjing Road, in the city center of Shanghai. The station is one of the busiest metro stations in mainland China, handling a daily traffic of over 700,000 passengers.

The opening of the downtown sections of Lines 12 and 13 in late December 2015 has allowed for alternative routes around the station, reducing the daily traffic by around 10%.

The station is an interchange between Lines 1, 2 and 8, making it an important interchange station boasting close to twenty exits. This station is exceptionally busy because of a unique combination of it being an interchange between a west-east and north-south line, as well as being surrounded by office buildings, shopping malls and several tourist attractions. This combination causes it to be extremely busy during peak times, but it remains very busy during the rest of the day as well.

In early 2009, a new side platform for Line 8 riders heading south (to Shendu Highway) opened. This platform was converted from a former link to Line 1. Passengers from Shiguang Road station heading south can exit from either door.

Since 2013, in the station hall of People’s Square the Metro operator set up a music corner. Every Saturday, both professional and amateur musicians and artists hit the stage. The tiny music corner has become a bridge for cultural exchanges. At the 500th show in September 2018, Matt Knowles — director of culture and education at the British Council in Shanghai - said what made it so special was that Shanghai Metro had turned a commercial space into a cultural one, giving people a chance to pause and reflect.

Places nearby

 People's Park
 People's Square
 Nanjing Road shopping street
 Fuzhou Road
 Shanghai Concert Hall
 Yan'an Park
 Huaihai Road
 Taiwan Strait Tourism Association Shanghai Office

Gallery

References

Railway stations in China opened in 1995
Shanghai Metro stations in Huangpu District
Line 1, Shanghai Metro
Line 2, Shanghai Metro
Line 8, Shanghai Metro
Railway stations in Shanghai